Extremschrammeln are an Austrian folk music band, led by guitarist and singer Roland Neuwirth. The group enhance the traditional Viennese folk music Schrammelmusik with satirical lyrics, as well as jazz, blues, rock, and 20th-century classical music influences. They perform original songs in German, Viennese, and English.

Big hits include "Der Weg Ist Weit Nach Floridsdorf" ("It's a Long Way to Floridsdorf") and "Fantastisch Elastisch" ("Fantastic Elastic"). 
 
The band is on the Warner Music label.

Discography
Nachtschicht: 2002, Warner Music
Geschrammelte Werke (2 CDs): 1999, Warner Music
Nr.9 Die Pathologische: 1998, Warner Music 	
I hab an Karl mit mir: 1996, Warner Music 
herzTON.Schrammeln.: 1996, BMG Arioola 	
Moment, der Christbaum brennt: 1995, Warner Music 	
Essig & Öl: 1994, Warner Music 	
Waß da Teufel (2 CDs): 1989, Warner Music 	
Guat drauf: 1988, Warner Music 	
Extrem: 1983, Alpha Music 	
Alles is hin: 1980, EMI Columbia 	
10 Wienerlieder und 1 Fußpilz-Blues: 1978, Preiser Records

See also 
 Wienerlied

External links 
 Extremschrammeln web site

Austrian folk music groups
Wienerlied